Daichi may refer to:
 the JAXA's Advanced Land Observation Satellite (aka Daichi)
 Daichi (given name), a Japanese given name
 Daichi, Iran (disambiguation), places in Iran

See also
Daiichi